Liolaemus duellmani, also known commonly as Duellman's tree iguana, is a species of lizard in the family Liolaemidae. The species is endemic to Argentina.

Etymology
The specific name, duellmani, is in honor of American herpetologist William Edward Duellman.

Geographic range
L. duellmani is found in Mendoza Province, Argentina.

Habitat

Description

Reproduction
L. duellmani is ovoviviparous.

References

Further reading
Ávila LJ, Martinez LE, Morando M (2013). "Checklist of lizards and amphisbaenians of Argentina: an update". Zootaxa 3613 (3): 201–238.
Ávila LJ, Vrdoljak JE, Morando M (2021). "Liolaemus deullmani Cei, 1978 (Reptilia: Squamata: Liolaemini), redescription of the holotype and variation in a microendemic and inadequately known species of Liolaemus from Northwestern Patagonia". Zootaxa 5081 (2): 263–274.
Cei JM (1978). "A New Species of Liolaemus (Sauria: Iguanidae) from the Andean Mountains of the Southern Mendoza Volcanic Region of Argentina". Occasional Papers of the Museum of Natural History, University of Kansas (76): 1–6. (Liolaemus duellmani, new species). (in English, with an abstract in Spanish).
Nenda SJ, Nespiur A, Lobo F, Abdala CS (2020). "Rediscovery of Liolaemus duellmani Cei, 1978 (Iguania: Liolaemidae): Description of a Female Found Near the Type Locality". South American Journal of Herpetology 18 (1): 42–45.

duellmani
Lizards of South America
Reptiles of Argentina
Endemic fauna of Argentina
Taxa named by José Miguel Alfredo María Cei
Reptiles described in 1978